Juan Eugenio Hernández Mayoral (born 21 April 1969 on Ponce, Puerto Rico) is the Director of the Puerto Rico Federal Affairs Administration (PRFAA) since 2 January 2013 and former Senator of Puerto Rico (2005-2011). He is son of former three-term Governor of Puerto Rico Rafael Hernández Colón.

Early years and studies 
Juan Eugenio Hernández Mayoral was born on 21 April 1969 in the City of Ponce to Governor Rafael Hernández Colón and First Lady Lila Mayoral Wirshing. He has three siblings: Rafael, José Alfredo, and Dora Mercedes.

Hernández Mayoral obtained his bachelor's degree in communications from the Universidad del Sagrado Corazón in 1991.
Hernández Mayoral obtained a degree in public administration from the Central University of the Caribbean in Puerto Rico.

Professional career 

Hernández Mayoral worked as executive director of the Rafael Hernández Colón Gubernatorial Library from 1993 to 2000. In 1996, he also worked as executive director of the annual conference of the Club of Rome.

Juan Eugenio also administered the Hernández Mayoral Law Firm in 2001. He was also a consultant in political communications from 2002 to 2004.

Political career 

In the 2004 general elections, Juan Eugenio was elected as Senator. During his first term, he served in the Public Safety, Federal and Consumer Affairs, Judicial, Municipal and Finance Affairs, Employment Affairs, Education, Culture, and Sports Committees of the Senate of Puerto Rico.

Hernández Mayoral was reelected on the 2008 elections. He has been the Ranking Member for the Urban and Infrastructure Committee, as well as the Veterans Affairs, Municipal Affairs, and Puerto de Las Américas committees.

An active member of the Puerto Rico Democratic Party, of which he serves as Secretary of its State Committee, he will be attending his seventh consecutive Democratic National Convention in Charlotte, North Carolina in September.

Personal life 

Hernández Mayoral has been married to Vivian Figueroa since 24 June 2000. He is a Roman Catholic.

References

External links 
 Hon. Juan Eugenio Hernández Mayoral on SenadoPR

1969 births
Living people
Members of the Senate of Puerto Rico
Popular Democratic Party (Puerto Rico) politicians
Puerto Rican party leaders
Puerto Rican people of German descent
Puerto Rican people of Spanish descent
 Politicians from Ponce
Universidad del Sagrado Corazón alumni